Jewish Social Democratic Labour Party in Palestine (Poale Zion) was a political party, founded in 1906 in Ottoman Palestine. Its founders belonged to a group of Jewish settlers, that had taken part in self-defense during the Homel pogrom. It was the Palestinian branch of the international Poale Zion movement.

The party joined the Second International in 1915. It was invited to join the International in February 1915, on the initiative of Émile Vandervelde, at a conference held in London (in which the Belgian, French, British and Russian labour parties participated. The meeting of the parties from the Central Power countries, held in Vienna in April 1915 did not object to the affiliation of the party.

References

Political parties in the Ottoman Empire
Labor Zionism
Second International
1906 establishments in the Ottoman Empire
Jewish political parties
Poale Zion